The Tyne Bridge Tower was a tower block that stood at the foot of the Tyne Bridge on the Gateshead side of the River Tyne, near the medieval St Mary's Church and the Sage Centre. It was constructed in the 1960s.  The 13-floor building was used by the Inland Revenue until June 2005, after which it stood empty until its demolition in March  2011.  The demolition was funded by One North East, a regional development agency.  Total cost was just over £500,000.

External links
 Tyne Bridge Tower to be sold off
 Tyne Bridge Tower comes down
 Fire during demolition

References

Buildings and structures in Gateshead
Buildings and structures demolished in 2011
Demolished buildings and structures in England